Aleksander Mikhailovich Suglobov (born 15 January 1982) is a Russian former professional ice hockey right wing. He played 18 games in the National Hockey League with the New Jersey Devils and Toronto Maple Leafs between 2004 and 2006. The rest of his career, which lasted from 1998 to 2013, was mainly spent in the Russian Superleague and Kontinental Hockey League, where he played for several teams. Internationally Suglovov played for the Russian national team once each at the World Junior Championships and World Championships, winning a gold medal at the 2002 World Juniors.

Playing career
Suglobov was drafted in the second round, 56th overall by the New Jersey Devils in the 2000 NHL Entry Draft.

Suglobov made his NHL debut with the Devils during the 2003–04 NHL season, playing one game in which he registered two shots. He spent most of that season with the Albany River Rats, the Devils' American Hockey League (AHL) affiliate. He put up 22 points in 35 games with the River Rats in that, his first season.

On December 17, 2005, Suglobov scored his first NHL goal with the Devils in Carolina against the Hurricanes.

On March 8, 2006 Suglobov was traded to the Toronto Maple Leafs for Ken Klee.

Unable to break into the NHL, Suglobov left for Russia on May 21, 2007, signing with CSKA Moscow of the Russian Superleague.

Honors
 Played for PlanetUSA All-Stars at the 2006 AHL All-Star Classic in Winnipeg.

Career statistics

Regular season and playoffs

International

External links
 

1982 births
Living people
People from Elektrostal
Albany River Rats players
HC CSKA Moscow players
HC Neftekhimik Nizhnekamsk players
HC Spartak Moscow players
Lokomotiv Yaroslavl players
New Jersey Devils draft picks
New Jersey Devils players
Russian ice hockey right wingers
Salavat Yulaev Ufa players
SKA Saint Petersburg players
Toronto Maple Leafs players
Toronto Marlies players
Sportspeople from Moscow Oblast